Irina-Camelia Begu and Anabel Medina Garrigues were the defending champions, but chose not to participate together.  Begu played alongside Vania King, but lost in the first round to Michaëlla Krajicek and Kristina Mladenovic.   Medina Garrigues teamed up with Yaroslava Shvedova, but lost in the semifinals to Krajicek and Mladenovic.
Marina Erakovic and Arantxa Parra Santonja won the title, defeating Krajicek and Mladenovic in the final, 0–6, 7–6(7–5), [10–8].

Seeds

Draw

Draw

References
 Main Draw

Topshelf Openandnbsp;- Doubles
2014 Women's Doubles